Tauseeq Shah (born 27 December 1995) is a Pakistani cricketer. He made his first-class debut for Rawalpindi in the 2018–19 Quaid-e-Azam Trophy on 8 September 2018. He was the joint-leading wicket-taker for Rawalpindi in the tournament, with thirty-two dismissals in six matches.

References

External links
 

1995 births
Living people
Pakistani cricketers
Rawalpindi cricketers
Place of birth missing (living people)